Sepol (Sepöľ) is a rural locality (a village) in Kochyovskoye Rural Settlement, Kochyovsky District, Perm Krai, Russia. The population was 407 as of 2010. There are 11 streets.

Geography 
Sepol is located 14 km southeast of Kochyovo (the district's administrative centre) by road. Slepoyevo is the nearest rural locality.

References 

Rural localities in Kochyovsky District